Dindori Lok Sabha constituency is one of the 48 Lok Sabha (lower house of Indian parliament) constituencies of Maharashtra state in western India. It is in Nashik district. This constituency was created on 19 February 2008 as a part of the implementation of the Presidential notification based on the recommendations of the Delimitation Commission of India constituted 12 July 2002. It first held elections in 2009 and its first member of parliament (MP) was Harischandra Devram Chavan of the Bharatiya Janata Party. Dr. Bharati Pawar of the Bharatiya Janata Party is elected as Member of Parliament in General Elections 2019 Now she represents Dindori Loksabha Constituency by defeating NCP Candidate Mr Dhanraj Mahale.

Assembly segments
Presently, Dindori Lok Sabha constituency comprises six Vidhan Sabha (legislative assembly) segments. These segments are:

Members of Parliament

Election results

General elections 2019

General elections 2014

General elections 2009

See also
 Malegaon Lok Sabha constituency
 Nashik district
 List of Constituencies of the Lok Sabha

Notes

External links
Dindori lok sabha  constituency election 2019 results details

Lok Sabha constituencies in Maharashtra
Lok Sabha constituencies in Maharashtra created in 2008
Nashik district